Elery's tube-nosed nat (Murina eleryi), also known as the Mekong bat, is a species of common bats first discovered in a forest of northern Vietnam.

References 

Murininae
Mammals described in 2009
Bats of Southeast Asia